The Handle-o-Meter is a testing machine developed by Johnson & Johnson and now manufactured by Thwing-Albert that measures the "handle" of sheeted materials: a combination of its surface friction and flexibility. Originally, it was used to test the durability and flexibility of toilet paper and paper towels.

The test sample is placed over an adjustable slot. The resistance encountered by the penetrator blade as it is moved into the slot by a pivoting arm is measured by the machine.

Details
The data collected when such nonwovens, tissues, toweling, film and textiles are tested has been shown to correlate well with the actual performance of these specific material's performance as a finished product.

Materials are simply placed over the slot that extends across the instrument platform, and then the tester hits test. There are three different test modes which can be applied to the material: single, double, and quadruple. The average is automatically calculated for double or quadruple tests.

Features
Adjustable slot openings
Interchangeable beams
Auto-ranging
2 x 40 LCD display
Statistical Analysis
RS-232 Output and Serial Port
Industry Standards:
ASTM D2923, D6828-02
TAPPI T498
INDA IST 90.3

References

External links
Manufacturer's datasheet

Textiles
Machines
Quality control
Toilet paper